At Mother's Request is a 1987 two-part television miniseries based on a true story (the Franklin Bradshaw murder). The movie stars E.G. Marshall and Stefanie Powers.

Plot summary
Frances Schreuder is a mother who is mean to her sons and sometimes her only daughter, especially when she imagines that they're not living up to her expectations as what she expects them to be as her children. Greedy and selfish, she decides she wants her inheritance from her rich father, multimillionaire, although miserly, auto parts and oil industrialist Franklin Bradshaw.

Frances has done nefarious things to get what she wants. For example, she has forged some of her father's checks to get things she wants and had her sons steal money from him when they were visiting him the summer before his death. She eventually decides she wants her money right away, especially when she finds he drew up a new, although unofficial, will that specifically left her and her children out of it. Frances manipulates her son Marc into murdering her father under the fear of ejecting him from her home if he didn't commit the murder.

Cast
 E.G. Marshall as Franklin Bradshaw
 Stefanie Powers as Frances Schreuder
 Doug McKeon as Marc Schreuder
 Jenna von Oÿ as Ashley Schreuder 
 Corey Parker as Larry Schreuder
 Frances Lee McCain as Lois Turner
 Terry O'Quinn as Jeol Campbell
 Ray Baker as Michael George
 Frances Sternhagen as Berenice Bradshaw
 Martin Donovan as Detective Rogen 
 George Sullivan as Detective Voyles 
 Roberts Blossom as Doug Steele 
 Chris Noth as Steve Klein 
 Dan Lauria as Myles Manning 
 Louis Borgenicht as Stanley Turner
 Nancy Borgenicht as Nancy Jones 
 Jasmine Guy as Bank Teller

Production
Parts of the miniseries were shot in Salt Lake City, Utah.

References

External links
 

1987 television films
1987 films
1980s American television miniseries
American films based on actual events
American television films
1980s English-language films